"Another Way" is a song by Italian DJ Gigi D'Agostino. It was released in July 1999 as the fourth single from the album L'Amour Toujours. Ola Onabule is the uncredited vocalist on L'Amour Toujours.

Music video
The music video was directed by Stephan Müller and Jörg Thommes, produced by company Vision Unlimited and filmed in September 2000 at Studio Voss, in Düsseldorf, Germany. It features D'Agostino turning into a rubber faced character who looks similar to Max Headroom. He starts doing the robot dance, then tries to impress a robotic looking woman who appears. They dance together in a synchronized way, and the female robot kisses him at the end of the video. The video takes place in a 3D CGI world including designs that look like cards and machine gears.

Formats and track lists

Germany
(B.I.G.; BIG 5064–12; Vinil, 12")
Another Way (Tanzen Mix) - 7:38
B Another Way (LP Mix)	- 5:59

(Golden-Dance-Classics; GDC 2236–8; CD, Maxi-Single, Reissue)
Another Way (Radio Cut) - 3:30
Another Way (Tanzen Mix) - 7:42
Another Way (LP Mix) - 6:02

(ZYX Music; ZYX 9177–8; CD, Maxi-Single)
Another Way (Radio Cut) - 3:30
Another Way (Tanzen Mix) - 7:42
Another Way (LP Mix) - 6:02

France
(EMI Music France; 7243 8 88922 6 1; Vinyl, 12", 45 RPM, Maxi-Single)
Another Way (Club Mix) - 7:41
B Another Way (Radio Edit) - 3:45

(EMI Music France; 7243 8 88922 2 3; CD, Single, Cardboard Sleeve)
Another Way (Radio Edit) - 3:45
Another Way (Club Mix)	- 7:41

Denmark
(Iceberg Records; ICE CDM 115; CD, Maxi-Single)
Another Way (Radio Cut) - 3:30
Another Way (Tanzen Mix) - 7:42
Another Way (LP Mix) - 6:02

Charts

References

Gigi D'Agostino songs
Eurodance songs
Songs written by Gigi D'Agostino
1999 songs
ZYX Music singles
EMI Records singles
Arista Records singles
1999 singles